This is a list of instruments used in ophthalmology.

Instrument list
A complete list of ophthalmic instruments can be found below:

Image gallery

References

Ophthalmology instruments
Instruments